Valli Lember-Bogatkina (30 October 1921 – 14 June 2016) was known as "The Grand Old Lady of Estonian watercolor". Her works are exhibited in cities around the world.

Biography 
Valentine Lember was the daughter of a builder, Gustav Lember, and Sinaida Lember (née Solotnikova), a housewife, in Tartu. In 1922, the family moved to Nõmme, where Lember studied at Nõmme Russian Primary School. At Nõmme Hiiu Primary School, she struggled with bad marks from teachers because her notebooks were full of drawings. The headmaster was impressed with her drawing and recommended that she attend the  State School of Arts and Crafts. Lember graduated in 1940.

From 1940 to 1941, she worked as an interior designer at Architect Meyer, mainly in glass and Mosaic. In 1941, she was recruited at the Tallinn Art College. She worked with the decorator Voldemar Haas Estonia Theater and as a decorator at the Varietees Plaza. In 1942, she received an invitation from the sculptor Anton Starkopf to study at the  Higher Visual Arts Courses in Tartu. It was there for the first time her watercolors were displayed at the school's autumn exhibition.

She was one of the first members of the Estonian Artists 'Union Artists' Association in 1944. She married Moscow artist Vladimir Bogatkin in 1949.

Art 
Lember-Bogatkina was employed to create public works of art for the city of Talinin and also traveled as part of a contingent of artists for the Soviet Estonian government.  She painted portraits, landscapes, and illustrations for children's books.

She began exhibiting in 1942. The artist's exhibitions included the Embassy of Copenhagen, Finland's Jyväskylä University, Tallinn Art Hall and Nõmme Museum. On November 3, 2012, Tõnismäe Gallery was opened with Valli Lember-Bogatkina's exhibition "Music / Dance", which featured her final theses at State Art School: three mosaics that represent three pillars of the Estonian economy through three beautiful girls.

Lember-Bogatkina also created monuments for commemorations and murals for art spaces.

Personal life
In 1949, the artist married Vladimir Bogatkin. Their younger son, Georg Bogatkin, is a ceramicist and their older son, Vladimir Bogatkin Jr., is a documentary director. Their daughter-in-law Airike Taniloo-Bogatkin is a sculptor.

Awards 
 1983 Merited Artist of the Estonian SSR 
 2006 Order of the White Star, Class IV

Commemoration 
The documentary Vivat Valli! Was dedicated to the 90th anniversary of Valli Lember-Bogatkina.

Books 
 Valli Lember-Bogatkina.  That's how it was.  Tallinn: Varrak, 2006 - 167 p.  (volume)

References

External links
 Valli Lember-Bogatkina put together a thick book Sakala, 21.09.2006
 Two elegant trips at once Sakala, 9.09.2006
 Ralf R. Parve, Weekly Juubilar - Valli Lember-Bogatkina 85 Kesknädal, November 1, 2006
 Watercolor Artists' Association
 Aigi Viira, programmed Õhtuleht, October 16, 2010
 Inna Grünfeldt, Life-happy classic Valli Lember-Bogatkina 90. Congratulations! Virumaa Official Journal, 30.10.2011
 "The Hall of Fame on April"

1921 births
2016 deaths
20th-century Estonian women artists
21st-century Estonian women artists
Estonian ceramists
Estonian women ceramists
Portrait artists
People from Tartu
Recipients of the Order of the White Star, 4th Class
Estonian people of Russian descent
Women watercolorists
Soviet ceramists
Soviet women artists